Scopula disparata is a moth of the  family Geometridae. It is found in Kenya.

Subspecies
Scopula disparata disparata
Scopula disparata somaliata (Prout, 1916) (Kenya: Somaliland)

References

Moths described in 1903
disparata
Moths of Africa